is the debut album by W, the duo formed by Morning Musume and Mini-Moni members and longtime friends Ai Kago and Nozomi Tsuji. Recorded while they were winding down their duties as Morning Musume and Minimoni members, the album consists of cover versions of songs released by other female Japanese pop duos from the later Shōwa period, including covers of songs by The Peanuts, Pink Lady, and Wink. The idea was that W were continuing the tradition that the original artists they covered on this album established, as well as give fans of Kago and Tsuji that had never heard the original recordings a taste of Japanese pop history.

W promoted the album in Japan with a variety of TV appearances, including a June 2004 special during which they performed alongside Pink Lady as both W and as part of Morning Musume. W and Pink Lady performed the latter's "Southpaw" while the full Morning Musume contingent and Pink Lady performed "Nagisa no Sinbad" and a medley of Morning Musume's "LOVE Machine" and Pink Lady's "S.O.S.".

At the end of July 2004, W "graduated" from (i.e. performed their final concert as members of) Morning Musume, allowing them to concentrate on W full-time. Duo U&U would be the only W album containing all classic J-pop covers, as future single releases would be originals composed by Tsunku and their follow-up album, 2nd W, would contain a mix of original material and more classic J-pop covers.

Duo U&U peaked at No. 4 on Oricon's weekly albums chart.

Track listing 

 Track 1 arranged by Hideyuki "Daichi" Suzuki
 Tracks 2 and 13 arranged by Cher Watanabe
 Tracks 3 and 6 arranged by Kōichi Yuasa
 Tracks 4, 5, and 15 and arranged by Yuichi Takahashi
 Track 7 arranged by Toshiya Shimizu
 Tracks 8-10 arranged by Yasuo Asai
 Track 11 arranged by Mikio Sakai
 Track 12 arranged by Jun Ichikawa
 Track 14 arranged by Laugh & Peace

Personnel 
Nozomi Tsuji - vocals (lead, harmony and background)
Ai Kago - vocals (lead, harmony and background)
Tsunku - additional backing vocals (Tracks 3, 14)
Hideyuki "Daichi" Suzuki - guitar, keyboards, drum machine, MIDI programming (Track 1)
Shunsuke Suzuki - guitar (Track 1)
Osamu Kawakami - upright bass (Track 1)
Masayuki Muraishi - drums (Track 1)
Cher Watanabe - guitar (Track 2), bass (Track 2), keyboards, drum machine, MIDI programming (Tracks 2, 13)
Kōichi Yuasa - keyboards, drum machine, MIDI programming (Track 3)
Yuichi Takahashi - acoustic guitar (Tracks 6, 11)
Koji - electric guitar (Track 6)
Toshiya Simizu - guitar, bass, keyboards, drum machine, MIDI programming (Track 7)
Yasuo Asai - guitar, keyboards, drum machine, MIDI programming (Tracks 8, 9, 10)
Shinichiro Mizue - bass (Track 8)
Ogu - drums (Tracks 8, 10), additional backing vocals (Track 14)
Yasuaki Maejima - piano (Track 9)
Tetsutaro Ike - bass (Track 9)
Hiroki - bass (Track 10)
Mikio Sakai - keyboards, drum machine, MIDI programming (Track 11)
Jun Ichikawa - keyboards, drum machine, MIDI programming (Track 12)
Kaya Uesugi - bass (Tracks 3, 12, 14)
Atsuko Inaba - additional backing vocals (Tracks 13, 14)
Laugh & Peace - keyboards, drum machine, MIDI programming (Track 14)

Charts

References

External links
 
 

2004 debut albums
W (group) albums
Covers albums
Japanese-language albums
Zetima albums